Vegetarian Society (Singapore) or VSS is a non-profit, non-denominational organisation. The Singapore-registered charity was established in 1999 to "Promote vegetarianism among the public and support and link individuals and organizations that practise, promote or endorse vegetarianism". VSS is the largest community for vegetarianism, veganism or any form of semi-vegetarianism in Singapore. Promoting a plant-based diet is one of the main goals.

VSS is a member of the International Vegetarian Union (IVU) and the Asian Vegetarian Union (AVU) to synchronise within the global context.

Events

Past events 
 January 2007: 1st Southeast Asia Vegetarian Congress 2007, Batam, Indonesia

Publications
 July 2015: Going green for life, Food confidential in the Singapore Press Holdings, an interview with Dr. George Jacobs.
 April 2015: More choices for Vegetarians in the Singapore Press Holdings with President George Jacobs and Secretary Pauline Menezes

Campaigns 
 2010: Helped to start Veggie Thursday, a project of 25+ Singapore organisations. Veggie Thursday promotes increased consumption of plant-based foods.
In 2014, Vegetarian Society started a two-week $50,000 poster campaign with advertisement posted on SMRT's Mass Rapid Transit (MRT) interchange stations. The campaign sought to challenge people to think about their meat eating practices.

Notable people and alumni 
 George Jacobs, president of VSS, served from 2003 to 2012 and again from: 2015–

See also
 EarthFest (SG)
 List of vegetarian festivals
 List of vegetarian organizations
 International Vegetarian Union
 Vegetarian Society
 List of vegetarian restaurants

References

Bibliography
 Annual Reports of the Vegetarian Society (Singapore) 2008–2014 
 Singapore Vegetarian Food Guide,  by the Vegetarian Society (Singapore)

External links
 

1999 establishments in Singapore
Charities based in Singapore
Organizations established in 1999
Vegetarian organizations
Vegetarianism in Singapore